Cagni is an Italian surname. Notable people with the surname include:

 Luigi Cagni (born 1950), Italian footballer
 Pascal Cagni (born 1961), French business leader
 Umberto Cagni (1863–1932), Italian polar explorer

Italian-language surnames